Ruben Apers (born 25 August 1998) is a Belgian racing cyclist, who currently rides for UCI ProTeam .

Major results
2016
 3rd Overall Niedersachsen-Rundfahrt der Junioren 
 5th Time trial, UCI Junior Road World Championships
 6th Overall Aubel–Thimister–La Gleize
 6th Trofeo Emilio Paganessi
2020
 1st Young rider classification, Course de Solidarność et des Champions Olympiques
 10th Overall Tour Bitwa Warszawska 1920
2022
 6th Egmont Cycling Race

References

External links

1998 births
Living people
Belgian male cyclists
People from Beveren
Cyclists from East Flanders
21st-century Belgian people